William Howe Windham (30 March 1802 – 22 December 1854) was the son of Vice-Admiral William Lukin Windham, and a British Member of Parliament. He lived at Felbrigg Hall.

He represented the constituency of East Norfolk 1832–1835 as a Liberal, but was defeated at the elections of 1835 and 1837. He was also High Sheriff of Norfolk in 1842. He married Lady Sophia Hervey, daughter of Frederick Hervey, 1st Marquess of Bristol, by whom he had one son; William Frederick Windham (1840–1866) who was the subject of a notorious lunacy case.

References

External links
 

|-

1802 births
1854 deaths
Deputy Lieutenants of Norfolk
High Sheriffs of Norfolk
Liberal Party (UK) MPs for English constituencies
UK MPs 1832–1835
People from Felbrigg
William